Kitty Sanders (born ) is a retired Dutch female volleyball player.

She was part of the Netherlands women's national volleyball team at the 1998 FIVB Volleyball Women's World Championship in Japan.

References

External links
http://www.cev.lu/Competition-Area/PlayerDetails.aspx?TeamID=2029&PlayerID=20797&ID=74
http://www.gettyimages.com/detail/news-photo/kitty-sanders-of-netherlands-tries-to-keep-the-ball-alive-news-photo/1009834#aug-1999-kitty-sanders-of-netherlands-tries-to-keep-the-ball-alive-as-picture-id1009834

1980 births
Living people
Dutch women's volleyball players
People from Ootmarsum
Sportspeople from Overijssel